Knut Ingebrikt Robberstad (22 April 1899  – 31 July 1981) was a Norwegian jurist and philologist.

He was born in Askøy, Hordaland, Norway. He was a professor of jurisprudence at the University of Oslo from 1945 to 1969. His juridical publications include Oreigningsvederlaget (1968) and Rettsutferd (1969). A philologist who chaired Noregs Mållag from 1952 to 1957, he translated several documents from Old Norse, including Magnus Lagabøters bylov (1923), a law dating from the reign of Magnus IV of Norway, and Gulatingslovi (1937).

References

1899 births
1981 deaths
People from Askøy
Noregs Mållag leaders
Norwegian legal scholars
Academic staff of the University of Oslo
Norwegian philologists
20th-century philologists